Acacia midgleyi, commonly known as Cape York salwood, is a tree belonging to the genus Acacia and the subgenus Juliflorae that is native to north eastern Australia.

Description
The tree has glabrous and branchlets. Like most species of Acacia it has phyllodes rather than true leaves. The resinous and crustose seed pods that form after flowering have a narrowly oblong shape and can be flat or spirally twisted one to three times. The seeds inside are arranged transversely.

Distribution
It is endemic to Queensland in the northern part of Cape York Peninsula where it is quite common. It is found around the Coleman River in the south up to the catchment areas for the Wenlock River and Olive Rivers in the north. It is mostly situated along the river banks and seasonal drainage systems along the eastern side of the Peninsula where it is usually a part of rainforest communities.

See also
List of Acacia species

References

midgleyi
Flora of Queensland
Taxa named by Bruce Maslin
Plants described in 2000